La Pedrera is a hamlet and southern suburb of Rivera in the Rivera Department of northeastern Uruguay. It is a peripheral area to the city of Rivera and, together with Mandubí, they form a southern extension of the city.

Geography
The hamlet is located on the junction of Route 5 with Route 27.

Population
In 2011 La Pedrera had a population of 3,363.
 
Source: Instituto Nacional de Estadística de Uruguay

References

External links
INE map of La Pedrera

Populated places in the Rivera Department